American-African Blues is an album by saxophonist Ricky Ford.

Recording and music
American-African Blues was recorded in concert at Birdland, New York City, on September 16, 1991. It is a quartet recording, with leader Ricky Ford (tenor sax) joined by Jaki Byard (piano), Milt Hinton (bass), and Ben Riley (drums). The album was produced by Mark Morgarelli.

Track listing
All compositions are by Ricky Ford.

"American-African Blues (1st Version)" – 10:56
"Environ" – 7:01
"Of" – 8:14
"Complex Harmony" – 6:41
"Descent" – 8:36
"Mostly Arco" – 5:52
"Encore" – 8:54
"American-African Blues (2nd Version)" – 7:22

Personnel
Ricky Ford – tenor sax
Jaki Byard – piano
Milt Hinton – bass
Ben Riley – drums

References

1992 albums
Ricky Ford live albums
Candid Records live albums
Albums recorded at Birdland